The Supreme Soviet was the common name for the legislative bodies (parliaments) of the Soviet socialist republics (SSR) in the Union of Soviet Socialist Republics (USSR). These soviets were modeled after the Supreme Soviet of the USSR, established in 1938, and were nearly identical.

State-approved delegates to the Supreme Soviets were periodically elected unopposed in show elections. The first free or semi-free elections took place during perestroika in late 1980s, in which Supreme Soviets themselves were no longer directly elected. Instead, Supreme Soviets were appointed by directly-elected Congresses of People's Deputies based somewhat on the Congresses of Soviets that preceded the Supreme Soviets. The soviets until then were largely rubber-stamp institutions, approving decisions handed to them by the Communist Party of the USSR or of each SSR.

The soviets met infrequently (often only twice a year for only several days) and elected the Presidium of the Supreme Soviet, a permanent body, to act on their behalf while the soviet was not in session. The presidiums were also empowered to issue decrees in lieu of law. If such decrees were not ratified by the Supreme Soviet at its next session, they were to be considered revoked. In practice, the principles of democratic centralism meant this power of veto was almost never exercised, meaning that Presidium decrees de facto had the force of law.

Under the 1936 and 1977 Soviet Constitutions, the Presidium of a Supreme Soviet served as the collective head of state of its republic. The Supreme Soviets also elected Councils of Ministers (Councils of People's Commissars before 1946), which were executive bodies.

After the dissolution of the USSR in late December 1991, most of these soviets remained the legislatures of independent countries until Armenia, Azerbaijan and Kazakhstan abandoned the system in 1995.

Supreme Soviets of the Soviet Republics

Supreme Soviets of the Autonomous Soviet Republics

References

See also
Supreme Council (disambiguation)
Soviet (disambiguation)

1938 establishments in the Soviet Union
1991 disestablishments in the Soviet Union
Government of the Soviet Union
Historical legislatures
Politics of the Soviet Union